The Lithuania national handball team is the national handball team of Lithuania.

Competitive record

World Championship

European Championship

Current squad

Notable players
Jonas Truchanovičius 1st Lithuanian to win EHF Champions League

Notable former coaches
 Voldemaras Novickis (1993–2000)
 Gintaras Savukynas (2009–2014, 2022–present)
 Mindaugas Andriuska (2020–2022)

References

External links

IHF profile

Men's national handball teams
Handball in Lithuania
National sports teams of Lithuania